Oleg Vasilyevich Shcherbakov (born 18 June 1966) is a former Russian football player.

References

1966 births
Living people
Soviet footballers
FC Fakel Voronezh players
FC Metallurg Lipetsk players
Russian footballers
Russian Premier League players
Russian expatriate footballers
Expatriate footballers in Ukraine
Expatriate footballers in Germany
Association football forwards
FC Khimik Dzerzhinsk players